John Hugh Brignal Peel (4 November 1913 – 22 May 1983) was a British journalist, author and poet, writing, as J. H. B. Peel, about farming and the countryside. From the 1960s, he wrote a fortnightly essay, "Country Talk", for the Daily Telegraph. He wrote and narrated radio and television programmes. He was also awarded "Book of the Year" on two occasions by The Sunday Times.

Education
His father was the comedian Gillie Potter. He was educated at Merchant Taylors' School, Northwood, and at Oriel College, Oxford.

Bibliography

Poetry
In the Country (1944)
Mere England: A Poem, Chaterson Ltd. (1946)
Frost at Midnight (1947)
Light and Shade, Robert Hale (1976) 
Time To Go, Watts & Co, 1942

Essays
Country Talk (illustrated by Balint Stephen Biro), Robert Hale (1970) 
More Country Talk (illustrated by Balint Stephen Biro), Robert Hale (1973) 
New Country Talk (illustrated by Balint Stephen Biro), Cassell (1975) 
Fresh Country Talk, Cassell
Country Talk Again (illustrated by Val Biro), Robert Hale (1977) 
Country Talk Continued, Robert Hale (1979) 0-7091-7861-1
Latest Country Talk, Robert Hale (1981) 
Another Country Talk, Robert Hale (1983) 
Off The Beaten Track,Robert Hale (1984) 
People And Places , Robert Hale (1980)  
Small Calendars , Arthur Barker (1948)

Travel related
Buckinghamshire Footpaths (1949)
The Chilterns (drawings by James Arnold), Elek (1950)
Portrait of the Severn, Robert Hale
Portrait of Exmoor, Robert Hale
Portrait of Thames published by Robert Hale
Discovering the Chilterns (1967)
North Wales and Anglesey (maps by Jack Parker and Alan Walton), Charles Letts & Co, (1969)
England in Colour, Batsford (1969) 
Along the Pennine Way, Cassell (1972)& by David & Charles (1979)
Along the Green Roads of Britain, Cassell
Along the Roman Roads of Britain, Cassell (1971) 
All over Britain, Robert Hale (1978) 
Peel's England published by David and Charles

Other
A Man's Life, Barker (1950)
The Gallant Story, Barker (1955)
An Englishman's Home (illustrated by Ronald Maddox), David & Charles (1972)

Notes

1913 births
1983 deaths